Tephritis brachyura is a species of tephritid or fruit flies in the genus Tephritis of the family Tephritidae.

Distribution
Ukraine & South Russia, to Iran, China.

References

Tephritinae
Insects described in 1869
Diptera of Asia